Jatoi may refer to:

 Jatoi (tribe), a Baloch tribe of Pakistan
 Jatoi, Muzaffargarh, a city in Punjab, Pakistan
 Jatoi Tehsil, Pakistan
 Ghulam Mustafa Jatoi (1931-2009), Pakistani politician